Yolande Laffon (1895–1992) was a French stage and film actress.

Selected filmography
 Love Songs (1930)
 Suzanne (1932)
 Mayerling (1936)
 Beethoven's Great Love (1937)
 The Mysteries of Paris (1943)
 The Misfortunes of Sophie (1946)
 Dilemma of Two Angels (1948)
 Gigi (1949)
 Two Pennies Worth of Violets (1951)
 Matrimonial Agency (1952)
 Leathernose (1952)
 La Putain respectueuse (1952)
 Papa, maman, la bonne et moi (1954)
 Blood to the Head (1956)

References

Bibliography
 Goble, Alan. The Complete Index to Literary Sources in Film. Walter de Gruyter, 1999.

External links

1895 births
1992 deaths
French stage actresses
French film actresses
Actresses from Paris
20th-century French actresses